Léo Bergère (born 28 June 1996) is a French professional triathlete.

He finished third at the 2020 World Triathlon Series, and qualified to compete at the 2020 Summer Olympics held in Tokyo, Japan. He competed in the men's triathlon. He was crowned world champion at November 2022 in Abu Dhabi, Yas Island during the 2022 World Triathlon Championship Finals.

References

1996 births
Living people
French male triathletes
Triathletes at the 2020 Summer Olympics
Olympic triathletes of France
20th-century French people
21st-century French people